Beenleigh railway station is located on the Beenleigh line in Queensland, Australia. It is one of two stations serving the suburb of Beenleigh in City of Logan, the other being Holmview.

History
Beenleigh station opened in 1885 at its original location at the same time as the opening of the line. It served as the terminus of the line until the South Coast line opened to Southport on 25 January 1889. It became the terminus of the line again when the South Coast line closed on 30 June 1964.

The station was reopened at its current location on 12 March 1988 in time for World Expo 88. The original 1885 station building was relocated to the Beenleigh Historical Village. On 25 February 1996, the line was again extended south when the Gold Coast line opened to Helensvale.

During the 2013/14 financial year, the station was rated as the worst for fare evasion with 1,048 tickets dispensed. South of the station lies a City network stabling yard.

It is worth noting that the station access is prone to flooding during severe weather events as its only commuter access is via the underpass.

Flooding warning signs are posted in the nearby parking areas. [https://twitter.com/QueenslandRail/status/847562022052966400 Queensland Rail Twitter shows significant high flood levels from the March 2017 Floods.

Services
Beenleigh is the terminus for all stops Beenleigh line services to and from Bowen Hills and  Ferny Grove.

It is also served by limited stops Gold Coast line services from Varsity Lakes to Bowen Hills, Doomben and Brisbane Airport Domestic.

Services by platform

Transport links
Logan City Bus Service operate six routes via Beenleigh station:
553: to Trinder Park
562: to Loganholme
563: Loganholme to Bethania
565: Windaroo to Loganholme
566: Windaroo to Brisbane City
567: to Holmview

Surfside Buslines operate two routes from Beenleigh station:
728: to Ormeau station via Yatala
729: to Ormeau station via Ormeau Hills

References

External links

Beenleigh station Queensland Rail
Beenleigh station Queensland's Railways on the Internet
[ Beenleigh station] TransLink travel information

Railway stations in Logan City
Railway stations in Australia opened in 1885
Beenleigh, Queensland